Filmmakers Without Borders (FWB) is a registered 501(c)(3) non-profit organization that sends filmmakers and art educators overseas to teach film, media, and technology to students in Africa, Asia, and Latin America.

Fellowship program
Filmmakers Without Borders provides fully funded fellowships to filmmakers, anthropologists, and educators. Fellows live and teach overseas for one academic year.

References

External links
 

Film organizations in the United States
Non-profit organizations based in New York City